A list of films produced in the United Kingdom in 1982 (see 1982 in film):

1982

See also
1982 in British music
1982 in British radio
1982 in British television
1982 in the United Kingdom

References

External links

1982
Films
Lists of 1982 films by country or language